Kathmandu Lullaby, is a 2012 Spanish drama film directed by Icíar Bollaín. The film received four Gaudí Awards nominations (Verónica Echegui won for best lead actress) and two Goya Awards nominations.

Plot 
The plot follows Laia, a teacher working in a school in Kathmandu. She marries a local man, Tshiring, so she can remain in Nepal once her visa expires.

Cast 
 Verónica Echegui as Laila
 Saumyata Bhattarai as Sharmila
 Norbu Tsering Gurung as Tshiring

Production 
The film is a Media Films and Levinver/Es.docu production, and it had the collaboration of TVC, TVE and Canal+.

Accolades 

|-
| align = "center" rowspan = "6" | 2013 || rowspan = "4" | 4th Gaudí Awards || colspan = "2" | Best Film Not in the Catalan Language ||  || rowspan = "4" | 
|-
| Best Actress|| Verónica Echegui || 
|-
| Best Production Supervision || Carlos González de Jesús, Larry Levene, Anna Casinna || 
|-
| Best Cinematography || Antonio Riestra || 
|-
| rowspan = "2" | 26th Goya Awards || Best Original Screenplay || Icíar Bollaín ||  || rowspan = "2" | 
|-
| Best Actress || Verónica Echegui ||  
|}

References

External links

Spanish drama films
2012 films
Films set in Nepal
2010s Spanish films